Sarah Jones (born July 17, 1983) is an American actress, best known for her starring roles as NASA astronaut Tracy Stevens in the Apple TV+ original science fiction space drama series For All Mankind and as Detective Rebecca Madsen in the Fox TV drama series Alcatraz.

Life and career

Jones was born in Winter Springs, Florida, and graduated from Winter Springs High School in 2001.  She "grew up dancing" with the expectation that it would become her career, but she turned to acting as "the next best thing" after her dancing ended because of injuries.  She had gotten her first break working as a dancer for the MTV Movie Awards.

She began in acting with a role on Medical Investigation, before going on to appear in other television credited roles that same year, including episodes of Cold Case and Judging Amy, before she appeared in the 2007 Hallmark Channel movie, Murder 101: College Can Be Murder.

Jones also appeared in a recurring role as Leah on the television show Huff, guest-starred in a 2006 episode of Ugly Betty as Natalie Whitman, and Big Love as Brynn. She played the youngest of three sisters who run a wedding planner business in Fox's 2007 short-lived dramedy series The Wedding Bells. She also appeared in two independent movies, Still Green and The Blue Hour. Jones won the Spirit of the Independent Award at the Fort Lauderdale International Film Festival for Best Ensemble for Still Green (2007), which she shared with Ryan Kelley, Douglas Spain, Noah Segan, Paul Costa and the rest of the cast of the film. She can also be seen in the Cary Brothers music video Who You Are.

She portrayed Polly Zobelle, the scheming daughter and accomplice of Ethan Zobelle in Sons of Anarchy.

In 2011, she had a featured guest starring role in the FX crime drama Justified episode "The Life Inside". Other notable credits include a recurring role on Big Love and Lone Star. Jones then signed on to play the lead role of Det. Rebecca Madsen in the J. J. Abrams show, Alcatraz. Jones has received wide recognition for her portrayal. She took part in a recreation of the chase scene in Bullitt. The show premiered on January 16, 2012. While the series itself was moderately received, her performance was generally praised by critics. Despite an impressive start, the series was officially cancelled by Fox on May 9, 2012, due to dropping viewership throughout its run. However, Jones was featured in a May 2012 spread for Vanity Fair magazine, and she quickly returned to series television, being cast as a regular on Vegas.

She portrayed Alison in the hulu original series The Path, and Amelia Davenport in the USA Network TV series Damnation.

In 2018, Jones was cast as Lynn in CBS drama pilot L.A. Confidential, based on James Ellroy's 1990 novel of the same name. 

In 2019, Jones starred as NASA astronaut Tracy Stevens in the Apple TV+ original science fiction space drama series For All Mankind. In 2021, Jones reprised her role in Season 2.

Personal life
Jones was dating Cary Brothers in 2007. She was dating fellow Sons of Anarchy actor Theo Rossi from 2010 until 2013. Jones describes herself as a feminist.

Filmography

Film

Television

Awards

References

External links

 

1983 births
Actresses from Florida
American film actresses
American television actresses
Living people
People from Winter Springs, Florida
21st-century American actresses
American feminists